Tahnai Lauren Rivera Annis (born June 20, 1989) is a footballer who plays as an attacking midfielder for Besta deild kvenna club Þór/KA. Born in the United States, she represents the Philippines women's national team, where she serves as captain.

College career
Annis played for the women's soccer team of the University of Florida at NCAA Division I from 2008 to 2011. She scored a total of 38 goals and made 16 assists in 96 matches for the Gators. In 2008, Annis became part of the SEC All-Freshman Team and SoccerBuzz.com Freshman All-America squad and in 2010 was also an All-American and member of the Southeastern Conference's All-Second Team.

Club career
After college, Annis played professionally for Þór/KA of the Úrvalsdeild kvenna, the top flight women's league in Iceland, from 2012 to 2014 starting in 62 matches and scoring 19 goals for the club. She helped the club win the league title in 2012 and earned the club's 2013 MVP award. She has played at the UEFA Women's Champions League with the Icelandic club.

Annis would leave the club in 2014 but would return in 2023.

International career

Tahnai Annis is eligible to play for the Philippines women's national football team through her mother Myla, who traces her roots to Lucena. She joined the national team in January 2018 in a training camp in the United States and eventually named as part of the final roster of the Philippines for the 2018 AFC Women's Asian Cup in Jordan and was designated as captain. Patrice Impelido also serves as co-captain for the national team for the continental tournament.

In the Philippines' first group stage match against host Jordan which ended in a 2–1 win, Annis had her first international cap. Annis scored her first goal for the Philippines in their 2–1 win against Nepal in the 2022 AFC Women's Asian Cup qualifiers held in September 2021.

Annis also led the Philippine squad that won its first ever ASEAN Football Federation tournament title as its captain – the 2022 AFF Women's Championship.

Coaching career
The women's soccer team of Averett University had Annis as their assistant coach.

Personal life
A native of Zanesville, Ohio, Annis graduated from the University of Florida in 2012 where she obtained a minor in business administration and a bachelor's degree in sport management. She entered Averett University to pursue a master's degree in business administration which has a focus in marketing.

Openly a member of the LGBT community, Annis is an Athlete Ally pro ambassador.

Career statistics

International 
Scores and results list the Philippines' goal tally first, score column indicates score after each Annis goal.

Honours
Philippines
Southeast Asian Games third place: 2021
AFF Women's Championship: 2022

References

1989 births
Living people
People from Zanesville, Ohio
Florida Gators women's soccer players
Filipino women's footballers
Philippines women's international footballers
American sportspeople of Filipino descent
Filipino people of American descent
Citizens of the Philippines through descent
Soccer players from Ohio
Women's association football midfielders
Þór/KA players
Lesbian sportswomen
LGBT association football players
Filipino LGBT sportspeople
LGBT people from Ohio
American LGBT sportspeople
American LGBT people of Asian descent
Filipino expatriate sportspeople in Iceland
Filipino expatriate footballers
Expatriate women's footballers in Iceland
American expatriate women's soccer players
American expatriate sportspeople in Iceland
Southeast Asian Games bronze medalists for the Philippines
Southeast Asian Games medalists in football
Competitors at the 2021 Southeast Asian Games